Blas Ramon López (born 14 May 1984 in Piribebuy) is a Paraguayan footballer playing for Sport Huancayo.

Career 
López started his career in Cerro Corá of Paraguay, then he was signed by Libertad of Paraguay, he disputed the Copa Libertadores 2004. He has played in Chile, Ecuador and now in Peru.

López has played for the Paraguay national football team in the Sudamerican Youth Championships of U-17 and U-20, also the 2001 FIFA U-17 World Championship and the 2003 FIFA World Youth Championship.

He currently plays for the Peruvian club Sport Huancayo.

References

External links 
 

1984 births
Living people
Paraguayan footballers
Paraguay under-20 international footballers
Paraguayan expatriate footballers
Association football midfielders
General Caballero Sport Club footballers
Cerro Corá footballers
12 de Octubre Football Club players
Club Libertad footballers
Club Nacional footballers
Puerto Montt footballers
Club Atlético 3 de Febrero players
Expatriate footballers in Chile
Expatriate footballers in Peru
Expatriate footballers in Ecuador